Chicken Soup for the Parent's Soul was the first book in the Chicken Soup for the Soul series to specifically address parenting. The stories, organized by topics such as “Insights and Lessons” and “Across Generations,” were compiled over a three-year period.

The book, originally published on September 14, 2000, spent twelve weeks on the New York Times Best Seller list, three of those in the top ten.  During the first six months of its release, it sold 452,305 copies alone.  In 2004, the Spanish language edition was published.

See also 
 List of Chicken Soup for the Soul books

References

External links 
 Official site for the Chicken Soup for the Parent's Soul book
 Official site for the Chicken Soup for the Soul series
 Original publisher of the Best Selling Chicken Soup for the Soul Books

2000 non-fiction books
Parenting advice books
Series of books